Tube stock may refer to:

 London Underground rolling stock designed to work in "tube size" tunnels
 Tubestock, meaning plants ready for revegetation